Artaxias I, of the Artaxiad dynasty, was a king of Iberia (modern-day Georgia) from 90 to 78 BC. He is known exclusively from the medieval Georgian chronicles which gives his name as Arshak.

A son of the king of Armenia, purportedly of Artavasdes I (r. c. 161–post 123 BC), he is reported to have been installed following the nobles’ revolt against the Iberian king P’arnajom of the Pharnabazid dynasty. The rebels justified their choice by emphasizing that he was married to a Pharnabazid princess, probably a sister of P’arnajom. The account of his reign is remarkably short, stating only that his reign was without any major trouble and that he further fortified the city of Tsunda in Javakheti.

References

78 BC deaths
Kings of Iberia
1st-century BC rulers in Asia
Year of birth unknown